Rajendra Kumar Tiwari  (born February 4, 1963), commonly known as R. K. Tiwari is an Indian civil servant and Indian Administrative Services officer of Uttar Pradesh cadre from the 1985 batch. He is serving as the Chief Secretary of the Government of Uttar Pradesh since his appointment in August 2019, succeeding Anup Chandra Pandey.

Education 
He completed his graduation in B.Tech from the Indian Institute of Technology Kanpur. He also holds a master's degree in Arts from the UK.

Career 
Tiwari joined Indian Administrative Service as an officer in 1985. He has served in several bureaucratic positions for the Government of India and the Government of Uttar Pradesh, including Joint Secretary to the Government of India in the Ministry of Agriculture And Co-operation. He has served previously in various departments in the Uttar Pradesh government like higher and secondary education, industrial development, agriculture, infrastructure, commercial tax, labour, IT and electronics etc.

He was the additional chief secretary home in the Government of Uttar Pradesh and has also served as District Magistrate and Collector in Agra, Sultanpur and Mirzapur in the past.

In August 2019, he was appointed as 53rd Chief Secretary of the Uttar Pradesh government by CM Yogi Adityanath. Before his appointment as the CS, he was serving as the Commissioner (Agriculture Production) of UP government. He also held the additional charge of UP chief secretary after the retirement of Anup Chandra Pandey in September 2019.

The Print reports him to be one of the UP's powerful civil servants in CM Yogi Adityanath's government.

References 

1963 births
Living people
Indian Administrative Service officers
Chief Secretaries of Uttar Pradesh
People from Uttar Pradesh